The 2019 BC Men's Curling Championship presented by Barkerville Historic Town & Park and Nufloors the provincial men's curling championship for British Columbia, was held January 29 to February 3 at the  West Fraser Centre in Quesnel.  The winning Jim Cotter team represented British Columbia at the 2019 Tim Hortons Brier in Brandon, Manitoba.

Qualification

Teams
The teams are listed as follows:

Knockout brackets
The draw is listed as follows:

A Event

B Event

C Event

Playoffs

1 vs. 2
February 2, 9:00am

3 vs. 4
February 2, 2:00pm

Semifinal
February 2, 7:00pm

Final
February 3, 10:00am

References

2019 Tim Hortons Brier
2019 in British Columbia
Curling in British Columbia
BC Men's Curling
BC Men's Curling
Cariboo Regional District